No. 87 Squadron of Indian Air Force is located at Panagarh Air Force Station and is assigned to Eastern Air Command. The tactical-aircraft squadron is used for special forces and also for Indian Army's new XVII Mountain Strike Corps located at Panagarh.

History
Initially, two C-130Js from No. 77 Squadron, Hindon AFS operated from Panagarh since its inauguration in May 2016, till the new Super Hercules arrived next year. The first two C-130J Super Hercules landed in July 2017. A month later in August 2017, remaining four aircraft arrived at the base with IAF commissioning the air base as Air Force Station Arjan Singh.

Lineage
 Constituted as No. 87 Squadron on 6 May 2016.

Aircraft
C-130J Super Hercules.

References

087